Tameslouht (in Arabic : تمصلوحت) is a mountain village in Morocco. It is situated 17 kilometers from Marrakesh.  It is known for its history as a religious center and its zawiyya. It is cited as the place of origin of tangia, a staple of Marrakshi cuisine.

Population

References
 Deverdun G., "Tamesluht (Tameslouht)", the history of a religious center, Encyclopédie Berbère, 1986, no 38

Specific

External links
Archnet pictures of Tamesloht retrieved on 4-24-2008
Photos retrieved on 4-24-2008
Idem retrieved on 4-24-2008

Populated places in Al Haouz Province
Rural communes of Marrakesh-Safi